General McLane School District is a school district located in Erie County, Pennsylvania, U.S.A.  It comprises the townships of Franklin, McKean, and Washington; the boroughs of McKean and  Edinboro, are located in McKean and Washington townships, respectively.

The district operates four schools:  General McLane High School (9-12), James W. Parker Middle School (5-8), and Edinboro and McKean Elementary schools (K-4).

Extracurriculars

General McLane High School achieved particular recognition on December 15, 2006, when its football team won the Pennsylvania Interscholastic Athletic Association (PIAA) Class AAA State championship despite it being the state's smallest AAA school.  On March 23, 2007, the Boys' Varsity Basketball Team won the Class AAA State championship, making GM the first school in PIAA history to win state championships in football and basketball in the same academic year.

References

External links
 

School districts in Erie County, Pennsylvania